Dobromil may refer to:

Dobromil (given name), a given name of Slavic origin
Dobromil, Lower Silesian Voivodeship (south-west Poland)
Dobromil, Podlaskie Voivodeship (north-east Poland)
Dobromilice, a village and municipality (obec) in Prostějov District in the Olomouc Region of the Czech Republic.
Dobromil, the Polish name for the town of Dobromyl, Ukraine

See also
 Dobrosław